Pōmare II (?–1850) was originally called Whiria. He was a Māori rangatira (chief) of the Ngāpuhi iwi (tribe) in New Zealand and the leader of the Ngāti Manu hapu (subtribe) of the Ngāpuhi. He was the nephew of Pōmare I. His mother, Haki, was the elder sister of Pōmare I. When he succeeded his uncle as leader of the Ngāti Manu he took his uncle's names, Whetoi and Pōmare. He is referred to as Pōmare II, so as to distinguish him from his uncle.

Girls' War (1830)
In 1830, Pōmare II's position as the principal chief of the Ngāti Manu was consolidated during the Girls' War, which is the name given to fighting on the beach at Russell, New Zealand, then known as Kororāreka, in March 1830 between northern and southern hapū of the Ngāpuhi. Pōmare II supported Kiwikiwi, the chief of the Ngāti Manu hapū of Kororāreka, when northern hapū led by Ururoa (also known as Rewharewha), a chief of Whangaroa and brother-in-law of the late Hongi Hika, raided the kūmara gardens at Kororāreka on 5 March 1830. Ururoa was supported by other chiefs from the various northern hapū, including Hone Heke and Rewa of the Ngāti Tawake hapū of Kerikeri.

Henry Williams, William Williams and other members of the Church Missionary Society (CMS) came over the bay from Paihia to attempt to mediate an end to the fighting. The mediation efforts appeared promising, with the missionaries believing that the chiefs would accept that the plunder of the kūmara gardens at Kororāreka would suffice as satisfaction of the earlier insults to Pehi, the daughter of Hongi Hika, and Moewaka, the daughter of Rewa (the reason the battle is called the Girls’ War). However, further fighting occurred, which resulted in the death of Hengi, a chief of Whangaroa. Eventually Henry Williams persuaded the warriors to stop the fighting. Reverend Samuel Marsden had arrived on a visit and over the following weeks he and Henry Williams attempted to negotiate a settlement in which Kororāreka would be ceded by Pōmare II to Tītore as compensation for the death of Hengi, which was accepted by those engaged in the fighting.

Events from the Girls' War to the Treaty of Waitangi
Pōmare II strengthened his pā at Otuihu to make it impregnable against any attack by the northern hapu of the Ngāpuhi who now controlled Kororāreka and he also worked to promote trade with the Europeans, who were described by Samual Marsden as "generally men of the most infamous character: runaway convicts, and sailors, and publicans, who have opened grogshops in the pas, where riot, drunkenness, and prostitution are carried out daily". He quarreled with European settlors and seized their possessions as compensation. He seized Captain James Clendon's whaleboat in 1832. However, he was usually on friendly terms with Clendon. He also seized Thomas King's boat in 1833. The latter event led to the mediation of the dispute by Henry Williams and the intervention of James Busby, the British Resident, which resulted in HMS Alligator anchoring off Pōmare's pā at Otuihu.

He also fought a three-month war with Tītore in 1837, until a peace agreement was negotiated by Tareha. Hōne Heke fought with Tītore against Pōmare II. An underlying cause of the fighting was a dispute as to the boundary line of the Kororāreka block that had been surrendered as a consequence of the death of Hengi some seven years previously in the Girls’ War.

Pōmare II signed the Treaty of Waitangi on 17 February 1840.

Flagstaff War - attack on the pā of Pōmare II

Customs duties were put in place in 1841, which Hōne Heke and Pōmare II viewed as damaging the maritime trade from which they benefited - each levied visiting ships a fee to anchor in the Bay of Islands and the imposition of the customs duties resulted in whaling and sealing ships choosing to avoid the Bay of Islands. While Pōmare II had grievances as to the actions of the colonial government following the signing of the Treaty of Waitangi, he did not support Hōne Heke's actions in what is known as the Flagstaff War.

After the Battle of Kororāreka on 11 March 1845, when Hōne Heke and Te Ruki Kawiti and their warriors sacked Kororāreka and Heke cut down the flagstaff, the colonial government attempted to re-establish its authority. On 28 April 1845, troops, under the command of Lieutenant Colonel William Hulme, arrived in the Bay of Islands. The following day the military forces advanced on Pōmare's pā, notwithstanding Pomare's position of neutrality. Letters of a treasonous nature from Pōmare to Pōtatau Te Wherowhero, intercepted, were said to have been the reason for targeting Pomare.

The military forces advanced up to Pōmare's pā and a tense armed standoff. Pōmare acquiesced to requests to come to Hulme, who promptly took him prisoner. Tricked, Pomare then ordered his warriors not to resist and his people escaped into the surrounding bush. He was taken on board HMS North Star. This left the military forces open to enter, loot and burn the pā. This action caused considerable puzzlement since up until that time Pōmare had been considered neutral, by himself and almost everyone else. The military forces also burnt two pubs or grog shops which Pōmare had established within his pā to encourage the Pākehā settlers, sailors, whalers etc. to visit and trade with him. North Star moved on to Auckland.

He was released after the intervention of Tāmati Wāka Nene and he was paid compensation. He remained neutral in the conflict between Hōne Heke and Te Ruki Kawiti against the colonial forces and their Ngāpuhi allies, who were led by Tāmati Wāka Nene.

Legacy
Pōmare II became a Christian. He died in July or August 1850.

Hare Pomare (?–1864) was the son of Pōmare II.

References

1850 deaths
New Zealand Māori people
People from the Northland Region
Ngāpuhi people
Musket Wars
Flagstaff War